Tucker Fredricks (born April 16, 1984) is an American speed skater and the US record holder in the 500 meter event. He competed at the 2006, 2010, and 2014 Winter Olympics.

Fredricks was born in Janesville, Wisconsin, where he graduated in 2002 from Joseph A. Craig High School. He began skating in 1994 when a friend of his father took him skating in lieu of playing hockey.  He considers his greatest accomplishment to be winning the gold medal in 500m at the 2003 World Junior Championships.

On November 17, 2007, at the World Cup Race in Calgary, Alberta, Canada, Fredricks beat the previous American 500m record (34.42) which was originally held by 2002 Olympic gold medalist Casey Fitzrandolph, with a time of 34.31.

Current record

Career wins 
 1st, 500m 2003 World Junior Speedskating Championships
 3rd, 500m 2002 World Junior Speedskating Championships
 1st, overall 2002 U.S. Junior Speedskating Championships
 1st, overall 2003 U.S. Junior Speedskating Championships
 1st, overall 2003 U.S. Junior Speedskating Championships
 25th, 2006 Olympic Winter Games, Men’s 500m
 12th, 2010 Olympic Winter Games, Men’s 500m (World Cup overall 500m champion)
 26th, 2014 Olympic Winter Games, Men’s 500m

Highlights
Fredericks has been a World Cup 500m medalist winner 30 times (11 times gold, six times silver and 13 times bronze). In addition, in 2007 he won the bronze for the World Single Distance Championships, and was the World Cup overall 500m champion.

References

External links 
 
 ISU profile
 
 
 
 
 Photos of Tucker Fredricks
 Tucker's U.S. Olympic Team bio

1984 births
Living people
American male speed skaters
Olympic speed skaters of the United States
Sportspeople from Janesville, Wisconsin
Speed skaters at the 2006 Winter Olympics
Speed skaters at the 2010 Winter Olympics
Speed skaters at the 2014 Winter Olympics
Joseph A. Craig High School alumni